Stepping Grounds is an arts and culture management company founded by Patrick Marín in 2009. After graduating from the Royal Conservatory of the Hague, Marín joined Nederland's Dans Theater 2 in 1993. He then danced with Nederlands Dans Theater 1 until 2009, working and creating with choreographers such as Jiří Kylián, Mats Ek, William Forsyth, Ohad Naharin, Hans van Manen, Nacho Duato, Lightfoot/Leon, Johan Inger among others. After his career as a dancer, Marín started Stepping Grounds in The Hague (NL) representing artists worldwide in the performing arts.

Artists 
Artists supported by Stepping Grounds are:

Choreographers 
Alexander Ekman
Marina Mascarell
Rafael Bonachela
Anouk van Dijk
:fr:Thierry Malandain
Martin Harriague
Juan Joarques

Composers 
Dirk Haubrich
Chris Lancaster
Mikael Karlsson

External links 
 Official website

References

Arts organisations based in the Netherlands